Joe Conlin is an American football coach who is currently the head football coach at Fordham University. He previously served as an assistant football coach at Yale University, Harvard University, the University of New Hampshire, and West Virginia University Institute of Technology; he won 2x Ivy League titles (2011 - Harvard Crimson, 2017 - Yale Bulldogs) as an assistant coach. Conlin played college football at the University of Pittsburgh, where he played defensive tackle. Conlin was named head football coach at Fordham University on December 22, 2017.

Conlin had four shoulder surgeries during his college football playing career. Conlin and his wife, Karen, have three daughters, Hannah, Katie and Emily.

Head coaching record

References

External links
 
Fordham Rams bio
Yale Bulldogs bio

Living people
Fordham Rams football coaches
New Hampshire Wildcats football coaches
Harvard Crimson football coaches
Yale Bulldogs football coaches
Pittsburgh Panthers football players
West Virginia Tech Golden Bears football coaches
1979 births